Pirani may refer to:

People 
 Amina Pirani Maggi (1892–1979), Italian stage and film actress
 Arlind Pirani (born 1990), Albanian footballer
 Felix Pirani (born 1928), British theoretical physicist and political activist
 Frederick Pirani (1859-1926), New Zealand politician
 Marcello Pirani (1880–1968), German physicist, inventor of the Pirani gauge
 Mario Pirani (1952-2015), Italian journalist

Other uses
 Pirani (Sufism)
 Pirani gauge, a thermal conductivity gauge used for measuring pressure in vacuum systems